S. R. Kathir is an Indian cinematographer in the Tamil film industry. He is a member of  ISC. He worked with directors including Gautham Vasudev Menon and Vignesh Shivan. He has worked with actors including Suriya, Vijay sethupathi, Samantha, Prabhu, and Jiiva.

Career
Kathir has worked on films including Kattradhu Thamizh (2007), Subramaniapuram (2008) and Naadodigal (2009), often collaborating in ventures by directors Sasikumar and Samuthirakani.

Filmography

Awards
Best Cinematographer at Boston international Film Festival (2022) - Jai Bhim
Best Cinemotographer Vijay Awards (2009)
Best Cinemotographer (2008) - Subramaniapuram
Best Cinemotographer Anandha Vikatan awards (2016) - Kidaari

References

External links

Living people
1978 births
People from Coimbatore
Indian cinematographers
Cinematographers from Tamil Nadu